A balti or bāltī gosht is a type of curry served in a thin, pressed-steel wok called a "balti bowl". The name may have come from the metal dish in which the curry is cooked, rather than from any specific ingredient or cooking technique. Balti curries are cooked quickly using vegetable oil rather than ghee, over high heat in the manner of a stir-fry, and any meat is used off the bone. This combination differs sharply from a traditional one-pot Indian curry which is simmered slowly all day. Balti sauce is based on garlic and onions, with turmeric and garam masala, among other spices.

Balti gosht is eaten in North India and some parts of Pakistan, as well as other parts of the world, such as Great Britain. The food seems to have arrived in England in Birmingham in 1971; sources suggest that it might have originated from Baltistan in the northern part of the region of Pakistan, but the exact origin is still unclear.

Origin, history and etymology
Balti, as a food, is named after the steel or iron pot in which it is cooked, similar to a karahi from the same region.
The word is found in Hindustani, Odia and Bengali, and means "bucket". The word developed from the Portuguese balde, meaning bucket or pail, and traveled to the Indian subcontinent via the Portuguese seafaring enterprises of the early 16th century. The word likely made its way into the English language during the time of British India.

According to Pat Chapman, a food historian, the origins of the word can be traced to the area of Baltistan, in the northern part of the region of Kashmir, where a cast-iron wok, similar to the Chinese wok, is used for cooking. Baltistan shares a border with China. In his Curry Club Balti Curry Cookbook, Chapman states: 

However, Colleen Taylor Sen states that the origins of balti gosht are unclear, as the food eaten in Baltistan "bears no resemblance" to balti gosht. As such, the name of the food may have originated from the fact that  bāltī gosht is cooked in a pot resembling a baltī, the Hindustani word for bucket. 

Another claim regarding the origin of balti cooking in Birmingham was that it was first served in 1977 in a restaurant called Adil's. At that time, the restaurant was located in Stoney Lane, Sparkbrook, and after some time relocated to another area, but since has returned to its original place in Stoney Lane.

Balti houses

Balti restaurants are often known in Birmingham as 'balti houses'. Some balti houses have a plate of glass on the table top with menus secured beneath. Balti houses typically offer large karack naan bread pieces, to be shared by the whole table.

Balti houses were originally clustered along and behind the main road between Sparkhill and Moseley, to the south of Birmingham city centre. This area, comprising Ladypool Road, Stoney Lane, and Stratford Road, is still sometimes referred to as the 'Balti Triangle', and contains a high concentration of balti restaurants. On 28 July 2005, a tornado caused extensive damage to buildings in the triangle, forcing many restaurants to close. Most reopened by the beginning of 2006.

Balti restaurants have now spread beyond the triangle, and can also be found in the south of Birmingham, along the Pershore Rd in Stirchley. Lye near Stourbridge to the west of Birmingham has become known as the 'Balti Mile' with up to a dozen restaurants clustered along the High Street.

The food and its style of presentation proved very popular during the 1980s, and popularity grew in the 1990s. Balti restaurants gradually opened up throughout the West Midlands, and then a large part of Britain. The expanded curry market in Britain is now said to take in 4 billion pounds sterling per year.

Outside Britain, a small number of balti houses are in Ireland and many other English-speaking countries, particularly Australia, Canada and New Zealand.

Since the late 1990s, British supermarkets have stocked a growing range of prepacked balti meals, and the balti restaurant sector has since faced increasing competition from the retail sector and from changes in customer tastes, along with other traditional South Asian and Indian restaurants.

See also
Pakistani cuisine
Chicken tikka masala
Balti wine

References

Further reading
 Curry Club Balti Curry Cookbook, Piatkus, London —  &  (1993)
 Modern Balti Curries, above title republished by John Blake Publishing, London (2006)
 Pat Chapman’s Balti Bible, Hodder & Stoughton, London —  &  (1998)
 2009 Cobra Good Curry Guide, John Blake Publishing, London —

External links

Baltistan
British cuisine
Culture in Birmingham, West Midlands
Curry in the United Kingdom
Indian cuisine
Kashmiri cuisine
Pakistani cuisine
Pakistani cuisine in the United Kingdom